Agra East (Vidhan Sabha constituency) was a legislative assembly of Uttar Pradesh. As a consequence of the orders of the Delimitation Commission, Agra East (Vidhan Sabha constituency) ceases to exist from 2008.

Member of Legislative Assembly
The Members of Legislative Assembly are given follows-

^ by poll

References

External links
 https://web.archive.org/web/20041224181644/http://eci.gov.in/ElectionAnalysis/AE/S24/partycomp342.htm

Agra
Former assembly constituencies of Uttar Pradesh
Politics of Agra district